Peroorkada is a suburb of Thiruvananthapuram in the state of Kerala, India.

Amenities
The locality expanded since the mid-1980s, when many Gulf-returning Malayalis bought properties or built houses in this area of Thiruvananthapuram, which led to a property boom that was accentuated by the establishment of the Doordarshan Kendra nearby, as well as the accessibility of hospitals and private schools.

Educational institutions 

 Kerala Law Academy

Suburbs of Thiruvananthapuram